Georgios Jakobides (Γεώργιος Ιακωβίδης; 11 January 1853 – 13 December 1932) was a painter and one of the main representatives of the Greek artistic movement of the Munich School. He founded and was the first curator of the National Gallery of Greece in Athens.

Life

He was born in Chidira, Lesbos, Ottoman Empire. At the age of 13, he traveled to Smyrna to live with his uncle and study at the Evangelical School. From 1870 to 1876, Jakobides studied sculpture and painting at the Athens School of Fine Arts, and in 1877 he went to the Academy of Fine Arts in Munich on a scholarship to continue his painting studies under Karl Theodor von Piloty.

In Munich, he lived for 17 years where he worked in his studio, painting mythological scenes, genre pictures, and portraits. His work is influenced by German academic Realism. His most famous paintings were of children but it said that after his wife's death in 1889, he stopped painting happy themes. In the capital of Bavaria he was regarded as a successful German artist selling many of his works at high prices. The Greek government invited him in 1900 to return to Athens to organize the National Gallery of Athens, and in 1904 he was appointed Director of the Athens School of Fine Arts, where he taught for 25 years. At this time, additional to his themes he produced formal portraits of eminent Greeks (e.g., Queen Sophia). He opposed all new artistic tendencies, including Impressionism and Expressionism, but supported younger artists to follow their own individual artistic tendencies.

He was awarded at five international exhibits: among those in Berlin 1891 and in Paris 1900.

His works are found in the National Gallery of Athens, private collections and in museums and art galleries around the world including art galleries in Germany and the Art Institute of Chicago.

His opus consists of some two hundred oil paintings, several of which are on display in Europe and overseas. His son, the actor Michalis Iakovides, donated his personal journal – which includes a list of his paintings between 1878 and 1919 – to the National Gallery of Greece in 1951.

He died in Athens in 1932.

Legacy 
In addition to his work as a painter, Jakobides was commissioned to create designs for a number of modern Greek coins including the 1 and 2 drachma coins from 1910 and 1911, the 50 lepta of 1921, and the 10 lepta of 1922.

Gallery

See also
 Munich School
 Art in modern Greece

References

External links

 Jakobides Digital Museum
 National Gallery of Athens Official website
 Andreas S. Ioannou, 19th Century Greek Art.

1853 births
1932 deaths
19th-century German male artists
19th-century Greek painters
20th-century Greek male artists
20th-century Greek painters
Academic staff of the Athens School of Fine Arts
Greek art curators
Greek male painters
Greek portrait painters
Greeks from the Ottoman Empire
Members of the Academy of Athens (modern)
Munich School
People from Eresos-Antissa